Mailuoning is compound based on herbs which is widely used in Traditional Chinese medicine in an attempt to treat people who have had a stroke.

Efficacy 

There is no good evidence that Mailuoning is of any benefit in treating people who have had a stroke.

Pharmacology 
Mailuoning is a herbal compound made from extracts of:
 Dendrobium
 Scrophulariae Radix
 Flos Lonicerae
 Radix Achyranthis Bidentatae.

The principal bioactive substances are scoparone and ayapin.

History

See also 
 Acanthopanax

Notes

References 

Alternative medicine
Chinese inventions
Traditional Chinese medicine